The Màrius Torres Secondary School (full name: Instituto de Educación Secundaria Ies Marius Torres) is one of the oldest state secondary schools in Catalonia.  It is located in the city of Lleida and it is possible to study the Spanish secondary educational programs.

Education in Catalonia
Secondary schools in Spain